Cengiz is the Turkish form of Genghis, as in Genghis Khan. Notable people with the name include:

Given name
 Cengiz Aktar (born 1955), Turkish political scientist, journalist and writer
 Cengiz Bektaş (1934–2020), Turkish architect, engineer, poet and writer
 Cengiz Biçer (born 1987), Liechtenstein football goalkeeper
 Cengiz Çandar (born 1948), Turkish journalist
 Cengiz Dağcı (1919–2011), Crimean Tatar novelist and poet
 Cengiz Kavaklıoğlu (born 1968), Turkish sprinter
 Cengiz Koç (born 1977), German heavyweight boxer
 Cengiz Küçükayvaz (born 1968), Turkish actor
 Cengiz Kurtoğlu (born 1959), Turkish musician
 Cengiz Özek (born 1964), Turkish puppeteer
 Cengiz Topel (1934–1964), Turkish fighter pilot
 Cengiz Ünder (born 1997), Turkish footballer

Surname
 Hakan Cengiz (born 1967), Turkish-German football coach
 Hüseyin Cengiz (born 1984), Turkish-Dutch footballer
 Mustafa Cengiz (1949–2021), Turkish businessman and former president of the sports club Galatasaray S.K.
 Orhan Kemal Cengiz, Turkish lawyer, journalist and human rights activist

See also
Chinghiz Aitmatov, Kyrgyzstani writer
Cengizhan Kartaltepe, Turkish volleyball player
Cengiz Topel Naval Air Station, Turkish Navy air station located east of İzmit in Kocaeli Province, Turkey
Cengiz Holding, Turkish conglomerate of construction, energy, mining, and tourism

Turkish masculine given names
Turkish-language surnames